The Sheikh Mukhtar-Vali Complex is a mausoleum located 5 km southwest of the town of Yangiariq, Xorazm Region, Uzbekistan. It was erected in the 16th century, above the grave of Sheikh Mukhtar-Vali.

This site was added to the UNESCO World Heritage Tentative List on 1 June 1996.

References

Central Asia
Mausoleums in Uzbekistan
Uzbekistani culture
World Heritage Tentative List